Edward R. Murphy (born 1937) is a former United States Navy officer, best known as the executive officer aboard the , a spy ship captured by North Korea in 1968.

Personal life 
Edward R. Murphy was born in Berkeley, California, and attended high school in St. Louis, Missouri. He graduated from Principia College in 1960 and joined the U.S. Navy. He resigned in 1969, after nine years of naval service.

Following his military service, Murphy owned and operated an RV dealership, worked for an insurance company and as a bus driver, and became a published author. He has been married to his wife, Carol, for 50 years.

USS Pueblo incident 
Lieutenant Murphy played a crucial role during the USS Pueblo incident, in which a U.S. spy ship and its crew was seized by the North Korean military on January 23, 1968. As second in command on the ship and the officer in charge of navigation, his testimony helped to paint an accurate picture of what actually occurred.

Murphy's autobiography, Second in Command, details his experience aboard the USS Pueblo and the challenges he and his crew faced. He describes the tactics of the North Koreans who captured the ship and the experience of being held hostage for eleven months as a prisoner of war. Murphy and his crewmen were repeatedly tortured for information during their internment. As Murphy was held in Pyongyang, he provided a rare and valuable perspective of North Korea during the late 1960s, as one of the few Americans to have been inside the country and to have observed military operations.

His appointment to the USS Pueblo was the first time Murphy served as executive officer. As a result of this fact, he adopted a "by-the-book" attitude that clashed with the mentality of the rest of the crew. Murphy and the captain, Lieutenant Commander Lloyd M. Bucher, were at odds throughout nearly the entire incident. Murphy publicly noted his dislike of Captain Bucher, claiming among other things that Bucher gave up classified information to the North Korean army, thus abandoning his duty to the U.S. military. While Murphy claimed Bucher was an incompetent drunkard and womanizer, Bucher describes Murphy as an incompetent coward. In fact, the men's account of the Pueblo incident differed greatly.

At the time of the Pueblo incident, Murphy's wife, Carol, was seven months pregnant and the two also had a two-year-old son. The absence of his family was on Murphy's mind throughout the capture.

When the crew finally returned to the U.S. in December 1968, the Navy held a court of inquiry for Murphy and four others. The men were accused of surrendering without a fight and failing to destroy classified material. The case was ultimately dismissed.

Awards 
 Purple Heart, awarded for injuries sustained during the USS Pueblo incident. 
 Prisoner of War Medal, awarded for the eleven months spent as a prisoner of war in North Korea in 1968.
 Navy and Marine Corps Medal, awarded 1966 for rescuing three men from a fishing boat off the coast at Centerville Beach County Park, Ferndale, California.

Further reading

References

External links

Murphy discusses The 1968 Capture of USS Pueblo by North Korea at the Pritzker Military Museum & Library

1937 births
Living people
American prisoners of war
Military personnel from California
People from Berkeley, California
Principia College alumni
United States Navy officers
Writers from California